Hard Bop is an album by drummer Art Blakey and The Jazz Messengers recorded in 1956 and originally released on the Columbia label.
It was performed by the Jazz Messengers and recorded in CBS Street Studio.

Reception

Allmusic awarded the album 4 stars calling it "an excellent hard bop set".

Track listing 
 "Cranky Spanky" (Bill Hardman) - 4:45   
 "Stella by Starlight" (Ned Washington, Victor Young) - 8:50   
 "My Heart Stood Still" (Lorenz Hart, Richard Rodgers) - 5:33   
 "Little Melonae" (Jackie McLean) - 8:20   
 "Stanley's Stiff Chicken" (Hardman, McLean) - 9:25

Personnel 
Art Blakey - drums
Bill Hardman - trumpet 
Jackie McLean - alto saxophone
Sam Dockery - piano
Spanky DeBrest - bass

References 

Art Blakey albums
The Jazz Messengers albums
1957 albums
Columbia Records albums